Joel Sánchez is the name of:

Joel Sánchez (racewalker)
Joel Sánchez (Mexican footballer)
Joel Sánchez (Peruvian footballer)
Joel Sanchez (baseball), American college baseball coach